Josiah Sherman was a Georgia State Senator during the Reconstruction era. He was from Vermont. He served in the 80th Georgia General Assembly from 1869 to 1870. Emma Spaulding Bryant (wife of John Emory Bryant) boarded with Sherman and his wife on the outskirts of Atlanta.

Sherman testified to a Congressional subcommittee on violence, intimidation, and abuse that Republicans and Republican Party organizers experienced in Georgia.

References

Georgia (U.S. state) state senators
19th-century American politicians
Year of birth missing
Year of death missing